This is a list of aircraft used by the Royal Flying Corps (RFC) from 13 April 1912, when it was formed from the Air Battalion Royal Engineers, until 1 April 1918 when it was merged with the Royal Naval Air Service (RNAS) to form the Royal Air Force (RAF). The RFC operated in parallel with the RNAS, whose aircraft are listed at List of aircraft of the Royal Naval Air Service. For a list of Royal Air Force aircraft see List of aircraft of the Royal Air Force.

Operational aeroplanes

Airships 
The airship service was disbanded 1 January 1914 and all airships transferred to the RNAS. See List of British airships
British Army Airship No.3/Baby/Beta/Beta II 
No.2A – 1910–
Delta – 1912–1914
Epsilon I and Epsilon II – 
Eta 1913–1914
Clément-Bayard II Zeta 1910–1910
Lebaudy Morning Post 1910–1911

Prototypes 
 ASL Valkyrie
 Airco DH.3
 Armstrong Whitworth F.K.7
 Armstrong Whitworth F.K.9 
 Armstrong Whitworth F.K.10
 Avro 521
 Beatty-Wright Biplanes
 Bristol-Prier Monoplane
 Bristol TB.8 & G.B.75
 Bristol S.2A
 Caproni Ca.1
 Caudron Type C/45 hp 
 Caudron G.IV
 Caudron R.XI
 Cody V biplane
 Curtiss C-1 Canada
 Dunne D.8
 Farman Type Militaire, 1910
 Flanders F.4
 Grahame-White Type VII & VIIc
 Grahame-White Type VIII
 Grahame-White Pusher Biplane
 Grahame-White School Biplane
 Handley Page Type O/400
 Howard Wright biplane
 Martin-Handasyde Monoplane
 Martinsyde F.3
 Morane-Saulnier AC
 Paulhan biplane
 Royal Aircraft Factory B.E.9
 Royal Aircraft Factory F.E.4
 Royal Aircraft Factory F.E.9
 Royal Aircraft Factory N.E.1
 Short Tractor Biplane
 Sopwith Sparrow
 Sopwith Triplane
 SPAD S.XII
 Vickers F.B.7/7A
 Vickers F.B.27 Vimy
 Vickers F.B.26 Vampire

 Wright Model H

Unmanned aerial vehicles
 British unmanned aerial vehicles of World War I

List of weapons of the Royal Flying Corps

Bombs
 Cooper bombs
 Ranken darts

Rockets
Le Prieur rocket - Incendiary air-to-air rockets

Machine guns
 0.303-inch (7.7-mm) Lewis gun
 0.303-inch (7.7-mm) Vickers machine gun

References

Notes

Citations

Bibliography

Aviation in World War I
Royal Flying Corps
World War I-related lists
United Kingdom Royal Flying Corps
Royal Flying Corps
United Kingdom military-related lists